Six Mile Lake is a lake in southern Alaska between Lake Clark and Iliamna Lake. The Newhalen River drains Six Mile Lake into Iliamna Lake. The city of Nondalton lies on the lake's western shores.

References 

Lakes of Lake and Peninsula Borough, Alaska
Lakes of Alaska